Desporto 2 is a Portuguese television sports show that airs Saturdays and Sundays on RTP2.

External links
 Official website 

Portuguese sports television series
2010s Portuguese television series